Southgate is a suburb south of Johannesburg, South Africa. It is located in Region F of the City of Johannesburg Metropolitan Municipality, just west of Mondeor. It is a small area of residency and is more known for its shopping mall (Southgate Shopping Centre).

References

Johannesburg Region F